Reiko Sakamoto may refer to:
 Reiko Sakamoto (table tennis)
 Reiko Sakamoto (mathematician)